Mario d’Angelo is a French academic, management consultant and author, born in 1954 with Italian and German ancestry.
His work in the field of culture and the creative industries is in the line with the system analysis and interdisciplinarity approach (public policies, cultural management, organisational sociology, economics and history). His empirical researches are focused on the European context.

His public writings have appeared in Les Échos, Le Monde Diplomatique, La Tribune, and other French newspapers.

Publications 
D'Angelo has extensively published in French among which several books have been translated into English:

 Cultural Policies in Europe (4 volumes). Strasbourg: Council of Europe Publishing.
 (with Paul Vesperini)A comparative approach 
 (with P. Vesperini) Method and practice of evaluation 
 (with P. Vesperini) Regions and decentralisation 
 Local issues, 
 Regards croisés sur l'Occident (with Djamchid Assadi), Eurorient no 31, 2011, L'Harmattan,
 La Musique à la Belle Époque, Paris, éditions Le Manuscrit, 2013, 
 Acteurs culturels: positions et stratégies dans le champ de la culture et des industries créatives. Une étude dans vingt pays d'Europe, Paris, Idée Europe (coll. Innovations & Développement), 2018,

External links
 Mario d’Angelo bio page on the website of the Burgundy School of Business
 Mario d’Angelo - Forum d‘Avignon

References

Academic staff of Paris-Sorbonne University
Sciences Po alumni
Paris Dauphine University alumni
1954 births
Living people